Berita (English: News) is a television news program broadcast on the Indonesian TV station  TV 7. replacing Tajuk which aired from 2002 to 2006. Its slogan was "Semakin Beragam Semakin Menarik" (The more Variety, The more Interesting). The program broadcast for four times each day through Berita Pagi (breakfast news), Berita Siang (lunchtime news), Berita Sore (afternoon news) & Berita Malam (night news)

Berita was launched on  February 20, 2006, by Jakob Oetama. on December 31, 2006, the program ended following the name change from TV 7 to Trans 7 after being acquired by Chairul Tanjung and sold to Trans Media.

References

External links 

  Portal News Site

  TV 7 site

Indonesian television news shows
Indonesian-language television shows
2006 Indonesian television series debuts
2000s Indonesian television series
2006 Indonesian television series endings